Espolde is a river of Lower Saxony, Germany. It flows into the Leine near Nörten-Hardenberg.

The Espolde springs in the eastern foothills of the mountain range Solling. Its source is located just north of the village  (part of Hardegsen) at about 311 m above sea level (NN).

See also
List of rivers of Lower Saxony

References

Rivers of Lower Saxony
Rivers of Germany